Sir Jeremy Paul Wright , MP (born 24 October 1972) is a British lawyer and politician who served as Attorney General for England and Wales from 2014 to 2018 and as Secretary of State for Digital, Culture, Media and Sport from 2018 to 2019. A member of the Conservative Party, he has been the Member of Parliament (MP) for Kenilworth and Southam, previously Rugby and Kenilworth, since the 2005 general election.

He served as Lord Commissioner of the Treasury from 12 May 2010 until his appointment as Minister of State for Prisons at the Ministry of Justice on 6 September 2012. He became Attorney General for England and Wales and Advocate General for Northern Ireland on 15 July 2014. Wright replaced Matt Hancock as Culture Secretary on 9 July 2018, serving in the post for a year until being sacked by incoming Prime Minister Boris Johnson in July 2019 and returning to the backbenches.

Early life

Wright was born in Taunton, Somerset. His parents were both teachers and he has one brother who served as a Commander in the Royal Navy. Wright was educated at two independent schools: Taunton School and Trinity School, New York City, before going to the University of Exeter, where he graduated as a Bachelor of Laws.

He was called to the Bar at the Inner Temple in 1996 and specialised in criminal law in the Midlands until his election to Parliament in 2005. He remains a member of No.5 Chambers in Birmingham but is officially listed as non-practising as of May 2013.

Parliamentary career

Wright was first elected to Parliament at the 2005 general election, when he won the seat of Rugby and Kenilworth from the sitting Labour MP Andy King who had represented the constituency since the 1997 general election. At the 2010 election he retained the newly created Kenilworth and Southam constituency, increasing his majority to 12,552.

In July 2007, Wright was appointed as an Opposition Whip and served as a Government Whip from 2010 until 2012, holding the office of Lord Commissioner of the Treasury. He served as a member of the Constitutional Affairs Select Committee between 2005 and 2007. In September 2012 Wright was appointed Parliamentary Under-Secretary of State in the Ministry of Justice. His specific responsibility was as Minister for Prisons and Rehabilitation. He was appointed Attorney General on 15 July 2014, replacing Dominic Grieve. For the purposes of this role, he was appointed a Queen's Counsel.

Wright set up the All-Party Parliamentary Group on Dementia in 2007.

Wright has generally supported the proposals for the HS2 London to Birmingham rail link which will run through his constituency. He has opposed some of the detailed original plans for the route, although supporting route changes made in 2010.

In 2016, Wright became the campaign manager for Stephen Crabb's leadership bid for the Conservative leadership election. Crabb withdrew from the contest after coming fourth in the first round and transferred his support to Theresa May.

Wright campaigned for the United Kingdom to remain in the European Union before the EU membership referendum on 23 June 2016.

In November 2016, Wright was criticised by a number of other Conservative MPs for his role in the Government's loss of a High Court case which gave MPs and peers a veto over when Brexit begins. Although it was suggested that he should resign as Attorney General, Wright retained his position.

In July 2018, after a series of resignations in May's cabinet after her decision of a "Soft Brexit" was reached at Chequers, Wright was appointed to Secretary of State for Digital, Culture, Media and Sport, after Matt Hancock was moved to become Secretary of State for Health and Social Care.

With Sajid Javid in late 2018, Wright warned social media firms that "the era of self-regulation is coming to an end" with regard to extremist content and announced a forthcoming 'online harms white paper', published in April 2019, which is expected to introduce legal regulation of online publishers and social media, including new censorship rules.

In late May 2022, Jeremy Wright became the 27th Conservative MP to publicly call for Prime Minister Boris Johnson to resign, in a 2,000 word letter on his website.

Stansted 15 Case

In 2019 - in his role at Attorney General he decided to prosecute the Stansted 15 under the Aviation and Maritime Security Act 1990 – terror legislation that was first introduced in the aftermath of the Lockerbie bombing for their role in stopping one of the UK Government's Foreign Deportation flights.

In their appeal, lawyers for the defence argued the legislation used to convict the group was not only rarely used but also was not intended for the kinds of peaceful actions undertaken by their clients. They said the prosecution stretched the meaning of the law by characterising the lock-on equipment they used to blockade the runway as devices used to endanger life.

In its judgment, the Court of Appeal stated that they “should not have been prosecuted for the extremely serious offence, because [their] conduct did not satisfy the various elements of the offence,” adding “there was in truth, no case to answer”.

Register of Members' Interests 

From 1 September 2021 to 1 September 2022, Wright has been Professor of Practice at the University of Warwick in Coventry, for which he receives  £10,000 per annum, paid monthly. This is for approximately 3 hrs a week. (Registered 1 October 2021).

Expenses claims

Wright has defended his expenses claims as an MP, including claiming nearly £3,000 for the purchase of furniture for a flat in London after he became an MP in 2005. He repaid £46.71 over-claimed for council tax in 2007–08 after a "genuine mistake". He also claimed just under £800 in mobile phone call charges which he was ordered to repay. He appealed the decision to order repayment of these expenses, claiming that he had requested permission to charge an amount for mobile phone calls as he did not have a landline installed in his London flat. Wright succeeded in his appeal and was not required to repay the amount claimed for mobile phone calls. Wright published errors on his website in 2009, placing political links on it, an activity banned if costs for the site are paid for from Parliamentary expenses, although he was not required to repay the expenses claimed in this instance.

Personal life

He married Yvonne Salter in 1998, with whom he has a son and a daughter. He and his wife live in the village of Shrewley in Warwickshire.

In November 2018, Wright said that he likes to unwind by spending time with his "very large" Lego collection. Wright described assembling lego bricks as "therapeutic".

He was knighted in the 2022 Birthday Honours for political and public service.

References

External links

 www.jeremywright.org.uk Jeremy Wright's website
Profile at the Conservative Party

 His profile at his chambers
 Debrett's People of Today

|-

|-

|-

|-

|-

1972 births
Living people
People educated at Taunton School
Trinity School (New York City) alumni
Alumni of the University of Exeter
Attorneys General for England and Wales
British barristers
Conservative Party (UK) MPs for English constituencies
English Anglicans
English King's Counsel
Members of the Inner Temple
Members of the Privy Council of the United Kingdom
People from Taunton
People from Warwickshire
Rugby, Warwickshire
UK MPs 2005–2010
UK MPs 2010–2015
UK MPs 2015–2017
UK MPs 2017–2019
UK MPs 2019–present
Advocates General for Northern Ireland
British Secretaries of State
Member of the Committee on Standards in Public Life
Knights Bachelor
Politicians awarded knighthoods
21st-century King's Counsel